Rhodacra is a genus of moths belonging to the subfamily Olethreutinae of the family Tortricidae.

Species
Rhodacra leptalea Razowski, 2013
Rhodacra parvusa Kawabe, 1995
Rhodacra pyrrhocrossa (Meyrick, 1912)
Rhodacra rupifera (Meyrick, 1909)

See also
List of Tortricidae genera

References

External links
Tortricid.net

Olethreutini
Tortricidae genera
Taxa named by Alexey Diakonoff